Markus Emanuel Salvator Habsburg-Lothringen (born 2 April 1946 in Schloss Persenbeug, Persenbeug-Gottsdorf, Lower Austria, Austria) is a member of the Tuscan line of the House of Habsburg, the former ruling house of Austria-Hungary.

Family 
Markus Emanuel Salvator was the eleventh child of Archduke Hubert Salvator of Austria and his wife Princess Rosemary of Salm-Salm. Through his grandmother, Markus Salvator is a great-grandson of Franz Joseph I of Austria and his wife Elisabeth of Bavaria. He lives in Kaiservilla in Bad Ischl, Upper Austria, which was the summer residence of Emperor Franz Joseph I and Empress Elisabeth of Austria, known as Sisi.

Marriage and issue 
Markus Emanuel Salvator married Hildegard Jungmayr on 30 December 1982 in Vienna. Markus Salvator and Hilda had three children together:

 Valentin Salvator Markus (30 July 1983) he married Christine Mittermayr in 2015
 Maximilian Salvator (28 December 1984)
 Magdalena Maria Sophie Rosemary (7 March 1987) she married Sebastian Bergmann in 2014.

Awards 

 Honorary citizenship of Holíč, town in western Slovakia (2016).
Servare et Manere: Friend of Peace. Since 2020 became the official Friend of Peace of the International Tree of Peace Project.

References 

1946 births
Austrian princes
House of Habsburg-Lorraine
Living people
People from Persenbeug-Gottsdorf
Tuscan princes